Terrence Michael Pegula (born March 27, 1951) is an American billionaire businessman and petroleum engineer. He is the owner of Pegula Sports and Entertainment which owns the Buffalo Sabres of the National Hockey League (NHL) and, with his wife Kim Pegula, the Buffalo Bills of the National Football League (NFL). Amassing his fortune via investments in fracking, he has interests in natural gas development, real estate, entertainment, and professional sports. His net worth is over $7 billion.

Professional sports

Buffalo Sabres
In February 2011, Pegula purchased Hockey Western New York LLC (the holding company that owns the Buffalo Sabres and the Buffalo Bandits of the National Lacrosse League) from previous owners Tom Golisano, Larry Quinn, and Dan DiPofi for $189 million. Pegula's purchase made an immediate positive impact, with players, fans and alumni invigorated by his investment in the team, the then First Niagara Center and the building of Harborcenter across the street. Pegula was quoted as saying, "Starting today, the Buffalo Sabres' reason for existence, will be to win a Stanley Cup." 

However, in the decade that followed, the Buffalo Sabres posted a 281-354-94 record and held the longest active NHL post-season drought.  Pegula and his wife have been heavily criticized for meddling in the Sabres' hockey operations. Many fans and critics alike have attributed the team's firing of six head coaches and three general managers since 2013 to this, as well as other controversial moves such as the trades of Ryan O'Reilly and Jack Eichel.

Buffalo Bandits
Included in the Sabres purchase was their National Lacrosse League (NLL) counterpart, the Buffalo Bandits, which have won four NLL championships.

Rochester Americans
In May 2011, Pegula began negotiations on behalf of the Sabres to re-purchase the Rochester Americans, which had served as the Sabres' American Hockey League affiliate from 1979 to 2008 (and had been owned by the Sabres from 1979 to 1996); the deal was completed in late June 2011. As part of the deal the Americans had to be split off from its NLL counterpart the Rochester Knighthawks since Pegula owned the Bandits due to ownership rules at the time. Along with the purchase of the Americans came upgrades to the team's arena, the Blue Cross Arena.

Buffalo Bills
On September 9, 2014, it was announced that Pegula had placed the winning binding bid to purchase the National Football League's Buffalo Bills, a team that was placed up for sale after the death of the original owner and team founder, Ralph Wilson. Pegula was a favorite among most local Bills fans and local politicians to buy the team due to his commitment to the Western New York area and local connections. He competed against future U.S. President Donald Trump and musician Jon Bon Jovi, the latter of whom was backed by principals of the Toronto-based Maple Leaf Sports and Entertainment, for purchase of the team. It was reported that the Pegulas made a $1.4 billion bid, all in cash. On September 17, 2014, the Pegulas were unanimously approved by the NFL's finance committee and were then scheduled to be presented at the NFL owners' meeting on October 8, 2014, for final owner approval; the Pegulas received unanimous approval from the league's owners on October 8 and closed the deal on October 10.

Pegula's first major order of business was to end the Bills Toronto Series, which he did in an agreement reached on December 3, 2014.

Upon the purchase of the Bills, Pegula and his wife Kim introduced One Buffalo, a marketing campaign which has since evolved into a brand used across all of their sports teams and associated products.

On March 28, 2022, it was announced that a deal had been reached between New York State, Erie County and the Pegulas for a 62,000 seat, $1.4 billion new stadium for the Bills in Orchard Park across the street from the current stadium. New York State will contribute $600 million in funding with Erie County contributing $250 million, the Pegulas contributing $350 million and the National football league via a G-4 loan $200 million. In addition the Pegulas signed the Bills to a 30-year iron clad lease. The stadium would be owned by New York State, a change from the current stadium which is owned by Erie County. New York committed to pay the maintenance and repair costs of the stadium. It was set to be the largest taxpayer contribution ever for a National Football League facility. The agreement was released four days before the New York state budget was due to be passed, making it hard for lawmakers to scrutinize the agreement. Critics of the agreement characterized it as corporate welfare.

Buffalo Beauts
On December 21, 2017, it was announced that Pegula had acquired the Buffalo Beauts of the league then known as the National Women's Hockey League and now as the Premier Hockey Federation. This made the Beauts the first NWHL team not owned by the league, the first professional women's hockey team in North America owned by the same person that owned the market's NHL team and got Pegula into women's hockey. Pegula divested the Beauts in 2019.

Rochester Knighthawks
In 2018, Pegula reached an agreement to purchase the intellectual property of the Rochester Knighthawks of the National Lacrosse League in autumn 2019. Curt Styres orchestrated the sale as he planned on moving his staff and roster to a new Halifax NLL team set to debut in the winter of 2020.

Investments

Natural gas
After working for a time for Getty Oil and Felmont Oil Co., Pegula founded East Resources a natural gas drilling company, with $7,500 from family and friends in 1983. It profited heavily upon discovery of deep layers of natural gas in the Marcellus Formation and  development of the hydraulic fracturing ("fracking") recovery process. Pegula eventually sold the Pennsylvania, New York, and Rocky Mountain assets of the company to Royal Dutch Shell for approximately $4.7 billion. He sold the Ohio and West Virginia assets of the company to American Energy Partners, LP for $1.75 billion in 2014. Pegula also owns Greater Rocky Mountain Regional Oil & Gas in Colorado and Wyoming, and JKLM Energy in Pennsylvania.

Real estate
In 2012, he won a bid for the development rights to the Webster Block on Buffalo's waterfront. The $170 million hockey-themed LECOM Harborcenter building, which is anchored by the two rinks, a large parking garage, retail, restaurants and a hotel, mostly opened in November 2014 with the rinks, restaurants and parking garage fully completed and opened in August 2015 with the completion and opening of the hotel and retail. Pegula is also the operator of KeyBank Center and Blue Cross Arena. In 2017, Pegula purchased 79 Perry Street, near KeyBank Center and teamed up with Labatt USA to redevelop the building into a mixed use facility including a small test brewery called the "Labatt Brew House" and restaurant called "The Draft Room" as well as Labatt's  U.S. headquarters, Pegula Sports and Entertainment's headquarters, and residential space.

Other investments
Pegula also owns a share of Black River Entertainment, an independent country music label. The label features such acts as Kelsea Ballerini, Kellie Pickler and Craig Morgan as well as the related Black River Publishing and Sound Stage Studio all under the Black River label based in Nashville, Tennessee.

Also under the Pegula umbrella is Impact Sports Performance, two high performance athletic training facilities which are based in Boca Raton, Florida and LECOM Harborcenter in Buffalo. Pegula owned 716 Food and Sport, a two floor sports themed restaurant which serves as the main business tenant of LECOM Harborcenter until he sold it to Southern Tier Brewing Company in 2021. 

Through a partnership with Southern Tier Brewing Company, Pegula launched a "One Buffalo" branded craft beer that sells at all Pegula-owned properties and elsewhere in the region. The One Buffalo brand has also been extended to a flavor of Perry's Ice Cream (which already licensed Bills and Sabres themed flavors prior to Pegula's purchases of the teams) and premium cupcakes, both formulated by Pegula's wife, a pronounced fan of desserts.

In July 2022, Pegula established Bison Wealth, a back-office consulting service based in Atlanta, Georgia.

Wealth
According to Bloomberg, Pegula had a net worth over $7 billion as of July 2021.

Philanthropy

Penn State hockey
An alumnus of Pennsylvania State University (Penn State), Pegula donated $102 million for the construction of the on-campus Pegula Ice Arena in 2010. As a result, the Penn State Nittany Lions, which had fielded club teams in both men's and women's hockey for years, would be able to transition both teams into NCAA Division I starting in the 2012–13 season.

This led to a domino effect across the men's college hockey landscape. Because six Big Ten universities now had Division I men's hockey programs (the minimum number of teams required under Big Ten bylaws for official conference sponsorship, and also the minimum required for a conference to be an automatic postseason qualifier), it was announced that Minnesota, Wisconsin, Michigan, Michigan State, and Ohio State would join Penn State in the Big Ten hockey conference starting in the 2013–2014 season. As a result, the CCHA ceased operations, with most schools (save for the three that joined the Big Ten and Notre Dame) joining the WCHA. Miami University and Western Michigan University, also previously in the CCHA, joined the upstart National Collegiate Hockey Conference along with former WCHA members St. Cloud State, Minnesota-Duluth, Denver, Colorado College, Nebraska-Omaha, and North Dakota. Ex-CCHA member Notre Dame joined Hockey East, which then recruited UConn from the Atlantic Hockey Association to begin play in Hockey East in 2014. After the dust settled, the ECAC was the only Division I conference not affected by the major conference realignment. Notre Dame subsequently left Hockey East in 2017 to join the Big Ten for hockey only.

Because Penn State's arrival gave the Big Ten only four varsity women's hockey programs, that conference was unable to add the sport, meaning that the women's hockey landscape did not undergo the radical changes that occurred in the men's game. The Penn State women's team settled in College Hockey America, a league that sponsors only women's hockey.

Houghton College
The Pegulas donated $12 million to Houghton College in Houghton, New York, of which Kim Pegula is an alumna, to build the Kerr-Pegula Athletic Complex. The facility includes new baseball and softball stadiums and a 115,000 square-foot field house with an eight-lane 200-meter track, five tennis courts, weight room, cardiac fitness center, and locker rooms. The new facility is mainly targeted toward Houghton College intercollegiate athletics, which recently moved up to Division III Athletics and the Empire 8 Conference. It opened on October 4, 2014.

Personal life
Pegula was born in Carbondale, Pennsylvania. His father worked in truck driving and coal mining. He attended high school at Scranton Preparatory School. From there he attended college at Penn State University where he earned a Bachelor of Science degree in petroleum and natural gas engineering. Beginning in 1985, he was based in Allegany, New York.

He currently lives in Boca Raton, Florida, along with his second wife, Kim Pegula (née Kerr), who grew up in Fairport, New York, and is a graduate of Houghton College. Kim was born in Seoul, South Korea, and at age 5, she was adopted in 1974 by Ralph and Marilyn Kerr. He has five children, two from a previous marriage (Michael and Laura), and three with Kim (Jessica, Kelly, and Matthew).  Jessica Pegula is a top 10 tennis player on the Women's Tennis Association's Pro Circuit. Pegula owns a large yacht, christened Top Five.

Political views
Though Pegula has been identified as a Republican, he does not speak publicly about his specific political views. Pegula and his wife have made political donations to politicians of both parties, generally to incumbents. In 2010, Pegula and his wife donated $305,000 to Republican Tom Corbett's campaign during the Pennsylvania governor's race; they were the largest contributors to the then Pennsylvania Attorney General.  In New York, Pegula and his wife donated $25,000 to New York Governor Andrew Cuomo's campaign during the 2014 elections and also donated $12,000 to Buffalo mayor Byron Brown, $2,500 to U.S. senator Chuck Schumer, and $250 to state senator Tim Kennedy, all Democrats. Pegula expressed support for legalizing ridesharing companies in upstate New York, the only area where it at the time remained illegal (as of 2017, New York State had only legalized it in New York City) and announced intent to partner with Uber to provide transportation to Pegula's sporting events.

References

External links
Pegula Sports and Entertainment – official web site
Terrence M. Pegula – profile at the Buffalo Sabres' official website
Terry Pegula – bio at the Buffalo Bills' official website
Profile on Terry Pegula by The Buffalo News
Profile on Kim Pegula by the Rochester Democrat and Chronicle

1951 births
Living people
American billionaires
American energy industry businesspeople
Philanthropists from New York (state)
American sports businesspeople
Buffalo Bills
Buffalo Bills executives
Buffalo Sabres owners
Businesspeople from Florida
Businesspeople from New York (state)
American real estate businesspeople
Florida Republicans
National Hockey League owners
National Lacrosse League owners
People from Allegany, New York
People from Boca Raton, Florida
People from Carbondale, Pennsylvania
Penn State College of Engineering alumni
Buffalo Bills owners